This is a list of athletes who have won multiple gold medals at a single Olympic Games.

List of most gold medals won at a single Olympic Games
This is a list of most gold medals won in a single Olympic Games. Medals won in the 1906 Intercalated Games are not included. It includes top-three placings in 1896 and 1900, before medals were awarded for top-three placings.

Timeline
The historical progression of the leading performance(s).

List of most individual gold medals won at a single Olympic Games

Timeline
The historical progression of the leading performance(s).

See also
List of multiple Olympic gold medalists
List of multiple Olympic gold medalists in one event
List of Olympic sweeps in Athletics
List of multiple Paralympic gold medalists
All-time Olympic Games medal table
List of multiple Paralympic gold medalists at a single Games

References

 
 
 See also references in the articles on each athlete.